Haw or HAW may refer to:

Fruit 
 many species of hawthorn (Crataegus)
 Haw flakes, Chinese sweets made from the fruit of the Chinese hawthorn, Crataegus pinnatifida
 several species of Viburnum, including:
 Viburnum rufidulum
 Viburnum prunifolium
 Viburnum nudum

Places 
 New Haw, a village in Surrey, England
 Haw River, a tributary of the Cape Fear River in north central North Carolina
 Haw River Valley AVA
 Hawaii, United States
 Haverfordwest Aerodrome, in Pembrokeshire, Wales (IATA airport code)

People
 Adrian Hardy Haworth (1767–1833), English entomologist and botanist with standard author abbreviation Haw.
 Horace Tabor (1830–1899), American prospector, businessman and politician

Surname 
 Brian Haw (1949–2011), protester in London's Parliament Square
 Chris Haw (born 1981), American writer
 Jack Haw (1902–1975), Australian rules footballer
 Jesse Haw (born 1971), American businessman and politician
 Johannes Haw (1871–1949), German Roman Catholic priest
 Robbie Haw (born 1986), English footballer
 Stephen G. Haw (born 1951), English botanist

Characters
 Miriallia Haw, a fictional character in the anime Gundam SEED

Other uses 
 Chin Haw, Chinese people who migrated to Thailand
 Haw wars (1865–1890), fought against Chinese quasi-military forces invading parts of Tonkin and Thailand
 Hamburg University of Applied Sciences
 Havelland Waste Management Company Ltd. (German: HAW Havelländische Abfallwirtschaftsgesellschaft mbH)
 Hawaiian language
 Supreme Court of Hawaii, in legal documents
 Heavy Airlift Wing, an international airlift organization
 Nictitating membrane, a transparent or translucent third eyelid on the eyes of some animals
 Sissipahaw or Haw people, a former tribe of the Siouan speaking Nations in the American Southeast

See also
 Haw. (disambiguation)
 Hawthorn (disambiguation)
 Lord Haw-Haw (William Joyce, 1906–1946), Nazi propaganda broadcaster to the United Kingdom during World War II